Sydney Irwin Pollack (July 1, 1934 – May 26, 2008) was an American film director, producer and actor. Pollack directed more than 20 films and 10 television shows, acted in over 30 movies or shows and produced over 44 films. For his film Out of Africa (1985), Pollack won the Academy Award for Best Director and Best Picture. He was also nominated for Best Director Oscars for They Shoot Horses, Don't They? (1969) and Tootsie (1982).

Some of his other best-known works include Jeremiah Johnson (1972), The Way We Were (1973), Three Days of the Condor (1975) and Absence of Malice (1981). His subsequent films included Havana (1990), The Firm (1993), The Interpreter (2005), and he produced and acted in Michael Clayton (2007). Pollack also made appearances in Robert Altman's Hollywood mystery The Player (1992), Woody Allen's relationship drama Husbands and Wives (1993), and Stanley Kubrick's erotic psychological drama Eyes Wide Shut (1999).

Early life
Pollack was born in Lafayette, Indiana, to a family of Jewish immigrants, the son of Rebecca (née Miller) and David Pollack, a semi-professional boxer and pharmacist. The family relocated to South Bend and his parents divorced when he was young. His mother, who suffered from alcoholism and emotional problems, died at the age of 37, when Pollack was 16.

Despite earlier plans to attend college and then medical school, Pollack left Indiana for New York City soon after finishing high school at age 17. Pollack studied acting with Sanford Meisner at the Neighborhood Playhouse School of the Theatre from 1952 to 1954, working on a lumber truck between terms.
 
After two years of army service ending in 1958, he returned to the Playhouse at Meisner's invitation to become his assistant. In 1960, John Frankenheimer, a friend of Pollack, asked him to come to Los Angeles to work as a dialogue coach for the child actors on Frankenheimer's first big picture, The Young Savages. It was during this time that Pollack met Burt Lancaster, who encouraged the young actor to try directing.

Career
Pollack played a director in The Twilight Zone episode "The Trouble with Templeton" in 1961. But he found his real success in television in the 1960s by directing episodes of series, such as The Fugitive and The Alfred Hitchcock Hour. After doing TV he made the jump into film with a string of movies that drew public attention. His film-directing debut was The Slender Thread (1965). Over time, Pollack's films received a total of 48 Academy Award nominations, winning 11 Oscars. His first Oscar nomination was for his 1969 film They Shoot Horses, Don't They?, and his second in 1982 for Tootsie. For his 1985 film Out of Africa starring Meryl Streep and Robert Redford, Pollack won Academy Awards for directing and producing.

During his career, he directed 12 actors in Oscar-nominated performances: Jane Fonda, Gig Young, Susannah York, Barbra Streisand, Paul Newman, Melinda Dillon, Jessica Lange, Dustin Hoffman, Teri Garr, Meryl Streep, Klaus Maria Brandauer and Holly Hunter. Young and Lange won Oscars for their performances in Pollack's films.

One of a select group of non- and/or former actors awarded membership in the Actors Studio, Pollack resumed acting in the 1990s with appearances in such films as Robert Altman's The Player (1992) and Stanley Kubrick's Eyes Wide Shut (1999), often playing corrupt or morally conflicted power figures. As a character actor, Pollack appeared in films such as A Civil Action, and Changing Lanes, as well as his own, including Random Hearts and The Interpreter (the latter also being his final film as a director). He also appeared in Woody Allen's Husbands and Wives as a New York lawyer undergoing a midlife crisis, and in Robert Zemeckis's Death Becomes Her as an emergency room doctor. His last role was as Patrick Dempsey's father in the 2008 romantic comedy Made of Honor, which was playing in theaters at the time of his death. He was a recurring guest star on the NBC sitcom Will & Grace, playing Will Truman's (Eric McCormack) unfaithful but loving father, George. In addition to earlier appearances on NBC's Just Shoot Me and Mad About You, in 2007, Pollack made guest appearances on the HBO TV series The Sopranos and Entourage. 
 
Pollack received the first annual Extraordinary Contribution to Filmmaking award from the Austin Film Festival on October 21, 2006. As a producer he helped to guide many films that were successful with both critics and movie audiences, such as The Fabulous Baker Boys, The Talented Mr. Ripley, and Michael Clayton, a film in which he also starred opposite George Clooney and for which he received his sixth Academy Award nomination, in the Best Picture category. He formed a production company called Mirage Enterprises with the English director Anthony Minghella. The last film they produced together, The Reader, earned them both posthumous Oscar nominations for Best Picture. Besides his many feature film laurels, Pollack was nominated for five Primetime Emmys, earning two: one for directing in 1966 and another for producing, which was given four months after his death in 2008.

The moving image collection of Sydney Pollack is housed at the Academy Film Archive.

Influences
In the 2002 Sight & Sound Directors' Poll, Pollack revealed his top ten films in alphabetical order:
Casablanca
Citizen Kane
The Conformist
The Godfather Part II
Grand Illusion
The Leopard
Once Upon a Time in America
Raging Bull
The Seventh Seal
Sunset Boulevard

Personal life and death

Pollack was married to Claire Bradley Griswold, a former student of his, from 1958 until his death in 2008. They had three children: Steven (1959–1993), Rebecca (b. 1963), and Rachel (b. 1969). In November 1993, Steven died at the age of 34 in the crash of a small, single-engine plane which clipped a power line and burst into flames in Santa Monica, California. Claire, Pollack's wife, died on March 28, 2011 at 74 years of age, from Parkinson's disease.

Concerns about Pollack's health surfaced in 2007, when he withdrew from directing HBO's television film Recount, which aired on May 25, 2008. He died from cancer the following day at his home in the Pacific Palisades neighborhood of Los Angeles, at the age of 73. He had been diagnosed about ten months prior to his death; the type of cancer has been variously cited as pancreatic, stomach, or of unknown primary origin.

Filmography

Film 
Directing and producing

As executive producer
Sanford Meisner: The American Theatre's Best Kept Secret (1985) 
The Fabulous Baker Boys (1989) 
Searching for Bobby Fischer (1993)
Sense and Sensibility (1995) 
The Talented Mr. Ripley (1999) 
Iris (2001) 
 Birthday Girl (2001) 
The Quiet American (2002) 
Leatherheads (2008) 
Recount (2008)

As producer only
Songwriter (1984) 
Bright Lights, Big City (1988) 
Presumed Innocent (1990) 
Sliding Doors (1998) 
Cold Mountain (2003) 
Breaking and Entering (2006)
Michael Clayton (2007)
The Reader (2008) 

Acting roles

Television 
Acting roles

Awards and nominations

References

External links

Detailed biography of Sydney Pollack

1934 births
2008 deaths
20th-century American Jews
20th-century American male actors
21st-century American Jews
21st-century American male actors
Actors from South Bend, Indiana
American aviators
American male film actors
American male television actors
American people of Ukrainian-Jewish descent
American television directors
Best Directing Academy Award winners
Deaths from cancer in California
Film directors from California
Film directors from Indiana
Film directors from New York City
Golden Globe Award-winning producers
Jewish American male actors
Jewish American writers
Jewish American film directors
Jewish American screenwriters
Male actors from Indiana
Male actors from Los Angeles
Military personnel from Indiana
Neighborhood Playhouse School of the Theatre alumni
People from Lafayette, Indiana
Primetime Emmy Award winners
Stella Adler Studio of Acting alumni
Writers from South Bend, Indiana